The Roman Catholic Metropolitan Archdiocese of Goa and Daman encompasses the Goa state and the Damaon territory in the Konkan region, by the west coast of India. The ecclesiastical province of Goa and Damaon includes a suffragan diocese, the Sindhudurg Diocese that comprises the Malvani areas of (central Konkan). The Archbishop of Goa also holds the titles of Primate of the East and Patriarch of the East Indies, also hold the title of the Syrian Catholic Primate  of the Archdiocese of Cranganore. The beginnings lie in the Padroado system of Portuguese Goa and Damaon, in the early 1900s the primatial see was transferred back to the Sacred Congregation for the Evangelisation of Peoples, as the Padroado system of the Indo-Portuguese era was being dismantled.

It is the oldest bishopric of the Latin Rite of worship in terms of activity in the East Indies, with its origins linked to the Portuguese discoveries, and their subsequent arrival at the St Mary's islands and Calicut, on the coast of the Malabar region.

The current Metropolitan Archbishop and Patriarch of the East Indies is Filipe Neri Ferrão.

Special churches 

 The archbishop's cathedral see, the Se Cathedral, or Sé Catedral de Santa Catarina, is in the city of Old Goa, Goa.
The diocese also has a minor basilica, the Basilica of Bom Jesus in Old Goa. The World Heritage Site composed of the Churches and Convents of Goa falls under its ecclesiastical jurisdiction. 
 The former Cathedral of Bom Jesus of the now-suppressed Diocese of Daman in Daman

Territory and statistics 
The archdiocese consists of the State of Goa and the union territory of Dadra and Nagar Haveli and Daman and Diu in India. As of 2014, it pastorally served 641,231 Catholics (31.0% of 2,067,200 total) on 4,194 km² in 167 parishes and 124 missions with 715 priests (410 diocesan, 305 religious), 1,503 lay religious (538 brothers, 965 sisters) and 80 seminarians.

Ecclesiastical province 
The Metropolitan has a single suffragan see:

 Roman Catholic Diocese of Sindhudurg, which includes the districts of Sindhudurg, Ratnagiri and Kolhapur in Maharashtra state, except the St. Francis Xavier parish in the city of Kolhapur. It was created on 5 July 2005, when its territory was split off from the Roman Catholic Diocese of Poona. It was a suffragan diocese of the Archdiocese of Bombay until 25 November 2006, when Pope Benedict XVI transferred it to the newly established metropolitan province of Goa and Damão. Between 1975 and 2006 the Archbishop of Goa and Damão, having no suffragan, was not entitled to wear the pallium.

History 
After the Portuguese conquest of Goa by Afonso de Albuquerque in 1510, King Manuel I built a chapel there in honour of St. Catherine, named patron of the city in 1518. Christians in the region were given into the charge of  OP, the Franciscan bishop of the titular see of Laodicea. He governed until 1527 when he was succeeded by Dom  OFM, the Franciscan titular bishop of Aureopolis, from 1529 to 1535.

King John III of Portugal commissioned the construction of a cathedral in Goa and Pope Clement VII founded the Diocese of Goa on 31 January 1533, with the papal bull titled Romani Pontificis Circumspectio. The jurisdiction of the new diocese at the time stretched from the Cape of Good Hope to China and Japan. On 3 November 1534 the creation of the diocese was confirmed by the  bull of Pope Paul III, since Clement VII's death had prevented the publication of its establishment. The diocese was originally a suffragan of the diocese of Funchal.

At the request of King Sebastian, on 4 February 1557 Pope Paul IV separated the Goan diocese from the ecclesiastical province of Lisbon and raised it to a metropolitan archdiocese, with the suffragan dioceses of Cochin and Malacca. In the course of time other dioceses were included in the metropolitan area of Goa: Macau, Funai in Japan, Cranganore and Meliapor in India, Nanjing and Beijing in China, and Mozambique in Africa. Daman in India is still included in Goa.

With the brief of 13 December 1572 Pope Gregory XIII granted the archbishop of Goa the title of Primate of the East. This is because the diocese of Goa was the first diocese of the Padroado in Asia. By 1857, Goa had gained several suffragan dioceses in the Indian subcontinent but retained only Macau and Mozambique outside that geographical area.

On 23 January 1886, Pope Leo XIII, through the bull Humanae Salutis Auctor, invested the archbishop of Goa with the honorary title of Patriarch of the East Indies. With the same bull, the diocese of Daman was established, to which was attached the title of the Archdiocese of Cranganore, that had been suppressed by the 24 April 1838 Multa praeclare decree of Pope Gregory XVI. These provisions had already been made in the concordat between the Holy See and Portugal on 23 June 1886. The honorary title of patriarch recognised the primacy of honour of the archbishop of Goa among all the bishops of the East and the historical vastness of his jurisdiction, at a time when his jurisdiction was reduced. He also enjoyed the privilege of presiding over all the synods of the East Indies

When the diocese of Daman was dissolved on 1 May 1928 with Inter Apostolicam, the title of Cranganore was attached to the Goa archdiocese. Thus, the archbishop of Goa came to be the titular archbishop of Cranganore.

In 1940, Dili (in East Timor) was elevated to a diocese and placed as suffragan under Goa; Mozambique was in the same year spun off from the metropolitan archdiocese. In 1953 the archdiocese of Goa lost the suffragan dioceses of Cochin, Meliampor and Canara following the ecclesiastical territorial reorganisation of the new Indian state.

On 19 December 1961, the Indian Union annexed the territories of Goa, and Daman and Diu. The following year the Patriarch Archbishop José Vieira Alvernaz left the territory. In 1965, the religious jurisdiction of Diu was entrusted to the Missionary Society of St Francis Xavier. The complexities of annexing Portuguese-ruled territories meant that the Vatican did not accept the resignation of the last patriarch until 1975. The dioceses of Dili and Macau were also de-linked from the ecclesiastical province and placed directly under the Holy See.

With the Quoniam Archdioecesi bull of 30 January 1978, Pope Paul VI appointed Bishop Raul Nicolau Gonçalves as Archbishop of Goa and Daman, also titled ad honorem Patriarch of the East Indies. By Inter Capital of 12 December 2003, Pope John Paul II appointed Rev. Filipe Neri Ferrao Archbishop of Goa and Daman, also granting him the honorary patriarch title.

The Archdiocese of Goa and Daman remained—until 25 November 2006—as just an archdiocese, since the archdiocese had had no suffragan dioceses since 1 January 1975, when Macao and Dili were separated from it. On 25 November 2006, Pope Benedict XVI with Cum Christi Evangelii made the diocese of Sindhudurg a suffragan of Goa and Daman, together with which it formed a new ecclesiastical province.

The civil district of North Kanara (Uttara Kannada) was part of the Roman Catholic Archdiocese of Goa and Daman till 19 September 1953 when the New Roman Catholic Diocese of Belgaum was erected. Two civil districts, Belgaum and North Kanara, were separated from the Archdiocese of Goa and two other civil districts, Dharwad and Bijapur, were taken from the Diocese of Poona to form the Diocese of Belgaum.

 31 January 1533: Archdiocese of Goa established from the Diocese of Funchal
 4 February 1557: Diocese of Cochin established as a suffragan diocese 
 4 February 1558: Established suffragan diocese – Diocese of Malacca
 4 February 1558: Promoted to Metropolitan Archdiocese of Goa
 1 May 1928: Renamed Metropolitan Archdiocese of Goa and Daman
 1 January 1976: Demoted to Archdiocese of Goa and Daman
 25 November 2006: Promoted to Metropolitan Archdiocese of Goa and Daman

Episcopal ordinaries

Saints and causes for canonisation
 St. Bartholomew
 St. Francis Xavier evangelised in Goa and his body is in the state.
 St. Joseph Vaz was a native of Benaulim.
 The Martyrs of Cuncolim
Bl. Rodolfo Acquaviva
Bl. Alphonsus Pacheco
Bl. Peter Berno
Bl. Anthony Francis
Bl. Francis Aranha
Some of the 205 Martyrs of Japan
Bl. Miguel de Carvalho, ordained a priest in Goa
Bl. Francisco Pacheco, seminarian in Goa
Bl. John Baptist Zola, missionary in Goa
Bl. Balthasar de Torres, seminarian in Goa
Bl. Diogo Carvalho (Didacus Carvalho), seminarian in Goa
Bl. Pietro Paolo Navarra, ordained a priest in Goa
Bl. Joao Batisto Machado, seminarian in Goa
 Bls. Denis of the Nativity (Pierre Berthelot) and Redemptus of the Cross (Tomás Rodrigues da Cunha)
 Bl. Emmanuel d'Abreu, SJ
 Ven. Agnelo de Souza
 Fr. Jácome Gonsalves

See also 

 List of Roman Catholic dioceses in India
 Patriarch of the East Indies
 Christianity in India
 Roman Catholicism in India
 List of Roman Catholic dioceses (structured_view)-Episcopal Conference of India
 List of parishes of the Roman Catholic Archdiocese of Goa and Daman
 Goan Catholics
 Francis Xavier

References

Sources and external links
 List of Indian Sees, from the Catholic Bishops Conference of India site
 Data of the Archdiocese, from the UCAN site
 (for Chronology of Bishops) 
 (for Chronology of Bishops) 
Official site of the Archdiocese of Goa and Daman

 Bibliography
  Conselho Ultramarino. Annaes do Conselho Ultramarino. Lisboa Imprensa Nacional, 1867. Capítulo: Ásia.
  Aleixo de Menezes. id=UPEqJWspkDIC Synodo Diocesano da Igreia e Bispado de Angamale: dos antigos christaos de Sam Thome das Serras do Malauar das partes da India Oriental celebrado pello Reuerendissimo Senhor Dom Frey Aleixo de Menezes Arcebispo Metropolitano de Goa, Primaz da India et partes Orientaes, Coimbra: Officina de Diogo Gomez Loureyro, impressor da Universidade, 1606.
  Associação Maritima e Colonial. Annaes Maritimos e Coloniaes.
   Manoel José Gabriel Saldanha História de Goa: política e arqueológica. Asian Educational Services, 1990. 
  Alexandre Herculano. A reacção ultramontana em Portugal: ou, A Concordata de 21 de fevereiro. Lisboa: Typographia de José Baptista Morando, 1857.
  Instituto Histórico, Geographico e Ethnographico do Brasil. Revista trimensal do Instituto Historico, Geographico e Ethnographico do Brasil Rio de Janeiro: B. L. Garnier, 1866. vol.29.
  Paiva, José Pedro. Os bispos de Portugal e do Império: 1495-1777 Coimbra: Universidade de Coimbra, 2006. 
  Ángel Santos Hernández, S.J., Las misiones bajo el patronato portugués, Madrid 1977, pp. 116–117
  Konrad Eubel, Hierarchia Catholica Medii Aevi vol. 3 , p. 204; vol. 4, pp. 195–196; vol. 5, p. 211; vol. 6, p. 227

 Pontifical documents
  Aequum reputamus bull in Bullarium patronatus Portugalliae regum, v I, p148–152 (in Latin)
  Etsi Sancta bull in Bullarium patronatus Portugalliae regum, v I, pp.191–192 (in Latin)
 Humanae salutis bull (in Italian)
 Ad nominum bull, AAS 68 (1976), p. 307 (in Italian)
 Cum Christi Evangelii bull (1976) (in Latin)
 Ereção da nova Província Eclesiástica de Goa e Damão (in Portuguese)

Daman and Diu
Roman Catholic dioceses in India
Religious organizations established in 1533
Christianity in Goa
1533 establishments in Portuguese India
Roman Catholic dioceses established in the 16th century